Green Hill Cemetery Gatekeeper's House is a historic gatekeeper's house located at Green Hill Cemetery, Greensboro, Guilford County, North Carolina. It was built in 1888–1889, and is a -story, cross-shaped, frame structure in the Gothic Revival style. It features a steeply pitched cross-gable roof with wide overhanging eaves.  It also has sawnwork bargeboards with kingposts and a full-width one-story porch.

It was listed on the National Register of Historic Places in 1979.

References

Houses on the National Register of Historic Places in North Carolina
Gothic Revival architecture in North Carolina
Houses completed in 1889
Houses in Greensboro, North Carolina
National Register of Historic Places in Guilford County, North Carolina